Carmelina Rotundo (born 24 November 1953 in Orbetello) is an Italian journalist, blogger and teacher.

Career
Carmelina was an Italian teacher at primary school and tutor at University (Scienze della Formazione Primaria in Florence) journalist and blogger.

Rotundo is the Director in charge of magazines Aghi di Pino, Art- Art and Accademia di Livorno. She is a collaborator of newspapers such as Toscana oggi and La Nazione of Florence. With the municipality of Impruneta she realized exhibitions of contemporary art and collaborated with the associations Fondazione Il Fiore, La Pergola Arte, the Galleria Centro Storico  and  Misericordia di Firenze for the same purpose.

On the web she collaborated with LeMeridie.it, Overthesky and La Terrazza di Michelangelo.

In 2008, she participated in City Lights, a photographic exhibition by Francesco De Masi, texts by Carmelina Rotundo, jewels by Ugo Bellini, Paolo Venturini and Gianni Testi in Florence - Museo Diocesano di Arte Sacra di Santo Stefano al Ponte (Spazio Incontri di Arte Contemporanea).

In 2010, Rotundo made friends with poet Vanna Bonta at the Camerata dei poeti of Florence. She befriended other poets and artists around the world: Giancarlo Bianchi, Lilly Brogi, Amalia Ciardi Dupree, Duccia Camiciotti, Anna Balsamo and Jakline Nakash De Blanck.

In 2014, she presented a sculpture at the Officina del profumo farmaceutica di Santa Maria Novella "Non abbiamo altre strade che quella dell'amore" made by artist Giuseppe Tocchetti.

In 2016, she was one of the speakers of the exhibition Arteè at the Consiglio regionale della Toscana at the Palazzo del Pegaso.

In 2017, she presented the anthology "Pianeta Donna" with Lilly Brogi, Giancarlo Bianchi e Franco Manescalchi at the salone Annigoni in the basilica di San Marco of Florence.

In 2018, she organized the group exhibition Oceani d'amore at palazzo del Pegaso seat of Consiglio regionale della Toscana.

In 2021, she accepted the position of President of the Art Culture Poetry Commission of the Istituto Culturale Vrinda Sole e Luna which he still holds today also conducting radio broadcasts for the Kappa Radio web radio managed by the Association.

Published works

Poetry anthologies

Stories books

Bibliography

References

External links
 ""
 ""
 ""
 "[www.comune.san-godenzo.fi.it/sites/.../1385394433488_volantino_presepi_2013.pdf]"
 ""
 ""
 "[libpol.altervista.org/pdf/aghidipino/aghidipino22.pdf]"
 "[www.artartimpruneta.it/e107_files/consiglio_2017]"
 " "
 " "
 ""
 ""

1952 births
Living people
Italian women poets
20th-century Italian poets
20th-century Italian women writers